John "Jack" Hather was an English professional football outside-left who played for Scottish club Aberdeen.

Born in Annfield Plain, County Durham, Hather joined Aberdeen in December 1948. He was part of the Aberdeen team who won the 1955 Scottish League championship and the 1955 Scottish League Cup.

After leaving Aberdeen in 1960, he moved back to the North East of England to play for amateur club Blackhall F.C.

Career statistics

Club 
Appearances and goals by club, season and competition

Honours

Aberdeen
Scottish First Division (1): 1954–55
Scottish League Cup (1): 1955–56

References

People from Annfield Plain
Association football wingers
English footballers
Aberdeen F.C. players
Scottish Football League players
Annfield Plain F.C. players
Footballers from County Durham
1926 births
1996 deaths